Palacio is a town in the Arenas de Iguña municipality of the Spanish region of Cantabria. In the year 2004 its population was 45.

See also

References
Cantabria 102 Municipios 

Towns in Spain